A vinyl roof membrane is a polyvinyl chloride (PVC) roofing membrane used in commercial construction. Vinyl roofing membranes have been around for over 40 years in the U.S. and longer in Europe. The British Board of Agrément states that certain vinyl roof membranes "should have a life in excess of 40 years." Vinyl roofs are also the only type of commercial roofing product that has an active recycling program in place.

There are many advancements in roofing (commercial and residential). Some are more effective than others. According to the United States EPA, "Green roofs can significantly reduce the amount of rain water that would otherwise run off an impervious roof surface."

References

Roofs